SEARLS is a London-based Irish singer songwriter and musician. Described as a sophisticated electronic-pop artist, he is best known for releasing SCAR, the first track from his Sophomore EP in August 2018. SCAR was produced and co-written with Tileyard Music's Gil Lewis. The song was accompanied by a Wes Anderson inspired video release. SEARLS acted as a leading man in London's West End and sang backing vocals for Adele.

SEARLS released debut EP Follow in 2016. SEARLS released his debut single Doing Time in 2015. This led to 4 remixes by prominent UK house producers including Sony Music's Kenny Hectyc. Demons was premiered in Clash Magazine on 12 May 2016. Two weeks later, Wonderland Magazine premiered Hurricane. On 17 June 2016 SEARLS released these two tracks as an EP along with title track Follow. SEARLS graduated with a BA in Applied Psychology from University College Cork

Discography

EP
 Follow (2016)

Singles
 "Scar" (2018)
 "Demons" (2016)
 "Hurricane" (2016)
 "Follow" (2016)
 "Doing Time" (2015)

References

External links

Irish male singer-songwriters
Living people
21st-century English singers
British male singer-songwriters
Singers from London
British contemporary R&B singers
Irish electronic musicians
People from Kinsale
21st-century British male singers
Year of birth missing (living people)
British electronic musicians